1977 in the Philippines details events of note that happened in the Philippines in the year 1977.

Incumbents

 President: Ferdinand Marcos (Independent)
 Chief Justice: Roberto Concepcion

Events

June
 June 28 – At least 17 persons were killed in a landslide caused by heavy rains in southern Philippines.

August
 August 21-27 – World Law Conference was held in Manila. On August 22, during the event, President Marcos announces amnesty for some persons "deemed guilty of subversion."

September
 September 5 – Sixteen persons were killed and 24 others were injured when two speeding trucks crashed into a bus in the Philippines.

October
 October 1 – Eugenio Lopez, Jr. and Sergio Osmeña III escaped from detention in Fort Bonifacio and flee to the United States.
 October 10 – A massacre in Patikul, Sulu leaves 35 Philippine Army officers and men dead.
 October 21 – A U.S. Marine Corps helicopter crashed during a military exercise in Mindoro, killing 24 servicemen.

November
 November 10 – Communist Party of the Philippines (CPP) Chairman Jose Maria Sison was arrested.
 November 15 – A typhoon killed about 80 persons in northern Philippines. Included among the dead were at least 40 persons killed in a hotel set off by a candle lit during a power failure.
 November 25 – Benigno Aquino Jr. was found guilty of charges and sentence him to death by firing squad, but the death sentence was postponed.

December
 December 16–17 – National referendum was called where the majority of the voters voted that President Ferdinand Marcos should continue in office as incumbent President and Prime Minister after the organization of the Interim Batasang Pambansa.
 December 16 – Thirty-two patients were killed by a fire in a mental hospital near Manila.

Holidays

As per Act No. 2711 section 29, issued on March 10, 1917, any legal holiday of fixed date falls on Sunday, the next succeeding day shall be observed as legal holiday. Sundays are also considered legal religious holidays. Bonifacio Day was added through Philippine Legislature Act No. 2946. It was signed by then-Governor General Francis Burton Harrison in 1921. On October 28, 1931, the Act No. 3827 was approved declaring the last Sunday of August as National Heroes Day. As per Republic Act No. 3022, April 9th was proclaimed as Bataan Day. Independence Day was changed from July 4 (Philippine Republic Day) to June 12 (Philippine Independence Day) on August 4, 1964.

 January 1 – New Year's Day
 February 22 – Legal Holiday
 April 8 – Maundy Thursday
 April 9:
Good Friday
Bataan Day
 May 1 – Labor Day
 June 12 – Independence Day 
 July 4 – Philippine Republic Day
 August 13  – Legal Holiday
 August 28 – National Heroes Day
 September 21 – Thanksgiving Day
 November 30 – Bonifacio Day
 December 25 – Christmas Day
 December 30 – Rizal Day

Births

January 4 – Vhong Navarro, actor, comedian, and host
January 9:
 Jose Riano, politician
 Maria Jocelyn Bernos, politician
January 12 – Piolo Pascual, actor
January 16 – Antonio Aquitania, actor and comedian

February 8 – Christian Vasquez, actor and model
February 14 – Donna Cruz, actress and singer
February 22:
 Gladys Guevarra, singer and comedian
 Yul Servo, actor and politician
February 25 – Niña Corpuz, journalist

March 19 – Gherome Ejercito, basketball player
March 31 – Eric Fructuoso, actor

April 18 – Anna Fegi, singer

May 7 – Bam Aquino, politician
May 12 – Onemig Bondoc, actor

June 1 – Dondon Hontiveros, basketball player and politician
June 23 – Gladys Reyes, actress 

July 10 – Don Allado, basketball player
July 12 – Jejomar Binay Jr., politician
July 13:
 Jake Roxas, actor
 Willie Miller, basketball player
July 14 – Jed Madela, singer and TV host
July 18 – Sunshine Cruz, actress
July 22 – Celino Cruz, basketball player
July 30:
 Troy Montero, actor and model
 Bryan Gahol, basketball player (d. 2014)

August 26 – Barbie Almalbis, singer, songwriter

September 1 – Kathleen de Leon Jones, Filipino-Australian actress, dancer, singer and television performer, Hi-5
September 5 — Patricia Bermudez-Hizon sportscaster
September 12 – Luis Santiago, TV director (d. 2005)

October 10 – Brandon Vera, actor, retired mixed martial artist and former MMA World Champion
October 18 – Gloc-9, rapper and recording artist
October 19 – Mo Twister, radio and television presenter

November 6 – Sol Aragones, journalist and politician
November 9 – Lord Allan Velasco, politician
November 26 – Amado Espino III, politician
November 27 – Andrea del Rosario, actress and model

December 5 – Francis Zamora, politician, businessman, and basketball player
December 11 – Bassilyo, actor and rapper
December 16 – Jennifer Mendoza, Former That's Entertainment Wednesday Group Member, Former Singer, Actress and TV host
December 29 – Erico Aristotle Aumentado, businessman and politician
December 30 – Jimmy Alapag, basketball player and coach

Deaths
April 30 – Eddie Peregrina, Filipino singer (b. 1945)
May 1 – José Locsin, Filipino doctor and politician (b. 1891)
September 8 – George J. Willmann, Naturalized Filipino missionary from the United States. (b. 1897)
November 11 – Abraham Sarmiento, Jr., Filipino journalist and political activist (b. 1950)

Unknown
August – Eulogio Balao, Filipino soldier and politician (b. 1907)

References